Manfredi Lefebvre d'Ovidio (born 30 April 1953) is an Italian-born Monegasque billionaire businessman. He is the chairman and former owner of Silversea Cruises, a company founded by his father. In June 2018, he sold two-thirds of the company to Royal Caribbean for US$1 billion, retaining a one-third stake in the company. As of August 2022, his net worth was estimated at US$1.3 billion.

Biography

Lefebvre d'Ovidio grew up in Rome, one of four children born into an Italian family. The son of Antonio Lefebvre d'Ovidio, legal professor and Italian jurist, and Eugenia Beck, of a German family, he was involved in a variety of family businesses from an early age and today is chairman of luxury cruise line, Silversea Cruises.

He attended law school at Sapienza University of Rome but did not complete his studies.

Career

His father's background in maritime law, among other industrial interests, led to the family's involvement in shipping and ultimately, in the cruise industry.  In 1988 they purchased control of Sitmar Cruises from the Vlasov family and in 1989, merged it with P&O's Princess Cruises unit. Silversea Cruises was founded in 1994 by his father with two ships purpose-built for the line, the Silver Cloud and the Silver Wind.  Lefebvre d'Ovidio led Silversea through his board position before being named chairman in 2001.  By that time, it added two more vessels (Silver Whisper and Silver Shadow) making it a four ship fleet.

As of 2017 Silversea operates nine vessels on worldwide itineraries that call in all seven continents.  It has been recognized as one of the World's best with multiple awards from Condé Nast Traveler and Travel + Leisure magazines as well as other travel publications and organizations.

He was the sole owner of Silversea, until June 2018, when Royal Caribbean agreed to pay about US$1 billion for a two-thirds stake in the company. In August 2018, Bloomberg assessed Lefebvre d'Ovidio as a billionaire.

On June 20, 2022, it was announced that Lefebvre d'Ovidio had bought the bankrupt Crystal Cruises brand and its two ocean vessels, Crystal Serenity and Crystal Symphony. Plans call for putting the ships back into service in 2023.

Personal life
He resides in Monte Carlo, Monaco, where Silversea is headquartered. He is divorced, with one daughter, Costanza.

Cruise industry advocacy
Lefebvre d'Ovidio was a key driver of the unification of the European cruise industry as chairman of the European Cruise Council (ECC) since 2010.

He led the merger of that association with the Cruise Lines International Association (CLIA) of which he has served on the board of directors until 2013. He remains on the board of CLIA Global and serves as chairman of CLIA Europe. He is also active in promoting international tourism efforts as the vice chairman of the World Travel and Tourism Council (WTTC), in charge for Europe and a member of the World Economic Forum (WEF).
Crystal Ships could belong to him.

References

Italian businesspeople
1953 births
Living people
Monegasque billionaires
Manfredi
Italian billionaires
Italian emigrants to Monaco